The group stage of the 2012–13 Santosh Trophy features 16 teams: the 4 automatic qualifiers and the 12 winners of the qualifiers.

The teams were drawn into four groups of four, and played each once in a round-robin format. The matchdays were from 21 February to 26 February.

The top team in each group advances to the Semi-Finals.

Group A

Group B

Group C

Group D

References

2012–13 Santosh Trophy